Referendums in Germany are an element of direct democracy. On the federal level only two types of a mandatory binding referendum exist – adopting a new constitution and regional referendums in case of restructuring the states. On the state level, all states have various types of statewide and municipal referendums.

Forms of referendums 
The German referendum system differentiate between three types.

 Volksbegehren (literally people's request) is a citizens' initiative – if the state parliament ignores the request it could directly lead into a "Volksentscheid"
 Volksbefragung (literally people's inquiry) is a non-binding ballot question and
 Volksentscheid (literally people's decision) is a binding plebiscite.

The term Volksinitiative (people's initiative) is a synonym of Volksbegehren. On the municipal level the three types are paralleled with 
 Bürgerbegehren (literally citizens' request) as the local citizens' initiative
 Bürgerbefragung (literally citizens' inquiry) for a local non-binding ballot question and
 Bürgerentscheid (literally citizens' decision) for a local binding plebiscite.

Note that in the city states the state citizens' initiative types are commonly called Bürgerbegehren while being at the same legal level as Volksbegehren in other states. Note that the term "Bürgerinitiative" (literally citizens' initiative) is used informally for non-partisan local campaign organizations (political action groups).

Federal concept 
Following World War II the new republic was founded with only minor elements of direct democracy. At the federal level, there are only two mandatory constitutional referendum types. One type is for enacting a new constitution. Changes to the constitution do not require a public vote and there is no provision for an initiative for a constitutional amendment. There has never been a referendum of this type, although there was an argument in that direction during German reunification. The other type requires a regional public vote in case of restructuring the States (Neugliederung des Bundesgebietes, "New Arrangement of the Federal Territory") which led to a number of effectless referendums to recreate states or change the territory of a state. In addition there was a referendum on the merger of Baden and Württemberg into Baden-Württemberg in 1951 (accepted) and a referendum on the merger of Berlin and Brandenburg into Berlin-Brandenburg in 1996 (rejected).

Bundesländer 
Originally, only some of the Bundesländer (federated states of Germany) had provisions for a general binding referendum (Volksentscheid, "people's decision") on popular initiatives (Volksbegehren, "people's request"), with Hesse and Bavaria also having a mandatory binding referendum on changes to the state constitution. Over the years all states have changed their constitutions to allow various types of statewide and municipal referendums. In all states, there is now a general right for referendums on statewide popular initiatives, which was used in Hamburg to push the state government to pass a law on a facultative binding state referendum in 2007. Most states have a form of non-binding ballot question (Volksbefragung, "people's inquiry") which has rarely been used - the most important of these had been the 1955 Saar Statute referendum. General forms of direct democracy were introduced in the communities with facultative ballot questions (Bürgerbefragung, "citizens' inquiry") and public initiatives (Bürgerbegehren, "citizens' request") which are both non-binding. In some areas, this has been expanded into a binding referendum type (Bürgerentscheid, "citizens' decision").

Initiative quorum 
Following World War II the right to petition to the government was installed with high barriers. Any popular initiative had to be filed with the authorities and the signatories have to identify before their signature is accepted. This is called official collection (German: Amtseintragung literally administrative inscription) in most legal areas. The other type is commonly referred to as  free collection (German: Freie Sammlung) where letters may be accumulated before being handed over. Naturally some of the latter signatures are found to be illegal which can be a source of dispute.

In order to push the government the initiative must reach a certain amount of valid signatures. The "quorum" is defined differently by each state.

Official collection

In the context of direct democracy, an official collection of signatures in Germany, refers to the collection of petition signatures for a referendum under supervision in a town hall or at other officially determined locations (normally a government building). This is in contrast to the free collection, where people may sign a petition that is freely circulated by the public. In a few German federal states, official collection is also required by law for the collection of campaign signatures for local elections.

In the German state of Brandenburg as a reaction to the criticism of the official collection, including from the SPD and Die Linke political parties a reform in 2012 created the possibility for municipal administrations to be able to determine further registration offices (e.g. bank and post office branches, shops).

Notable referendums in Germany
 Territory of the Saar Basin (1920–1935)
 1935 Saar status referendum

 Saar Protectorate (1947–1956)
 1955 Saar Statute referendum

 Eastern Germany (1949–1990)
 1951 East German referendum
 1954 East German referendum
 1968 East German referendum

 post-1990 Germany
1995 Bavarian referendum on introduction of local referendums
1998 Bavarian referendum on the abolition of the Bavarian Senate
2010 Bavarian referendum on a smoking ban in gastronomy
2011 Baden-Württemberg referendum on Stuttgart 21
2011 Berlin water referendum
2013 Berlin energy referendum
2021 Berlin referendum

References